Dr. Fell, Detective, and Other Stories, is a mystery short story collection written by John Dickson Carr and first published in the US by Lawrence E. Spivak (The American Mercury) in 1947.

Most of the stories feature his series detective Gideon Fell.

Stories and first publications

Dr. Gideon Fell:
 The Proverbial Murder: first published in Ellery Queen's Mystery Magazine in July 1943, as "The Proverbial Murderer".
 The Locked Room: first published in Strand Magazine in July 1940.
 The Wrong Problem
 The Hangman Won't Wait
 A Guest in the House (a shortened and altered version of Death and the Gilded Man)

Others:
 The Devil in the Summer House
 Will You Walk Into My Parlor?
 Strictly Diplomatic

References
 Page for this collection on Russian J. D. Carr and "locked room" murders website

Short story collections by John Dickson Carr
Mystery short story collections
1947 short story collections